Nadwatul Musannifeen was an academic research institution and publishing house in Delhi. The institution was co-founded by scholars including Atiqur Rahman Usmani, Hamid al-Ansari Ghazi, Hifzur Rahman Seoharwi and Saeed Ahmad Akbarabadi in 1938.

History
Nadwatul Musannifeen was established by Atiqur Rahman Usmani, Hamid al-Ansari Ghazi, Hifzur Rahman Seoharwi and Saeed Ahmad Akbarabadi in 1938. Originally set up in Karol Bagh, the institution suffered losses during 1947 riots. It was moved to nearby Jama Masjid, Delhi post the Partition of India by Atiqur Rahman Usmani.

The institution has published books on issues related to religion, history, culture and theology. The institution published Burhan, a magazine that is regarded as the best Islamiyat magazine after the Al-Ma'ārif of Shibli Academy.

Associated scholars
 Muhammad Taqi Amini
 Zayn al-Abidin Sajjad Meerthi

Publications

The Nadwatul Musannifeen has published more than 250 books including Official Letters of Abu Bakr, Official Letters of Umar Farooq, Official Letters of Usman Ghani,  Economic Analysis of Orthodox Caliphate, Ancient India in Arabic Literature, New Light on Indian History - from an Arabic manuscript, A statesman of the First Century and History of Ridda compiled by Khurshid Ahmad Fariq, a former head professor of the Arabic department of Delhi University.

Legacy
At the Jamia Millia Islamia, Abdul Waris Khan wrote a doctoral thesis entitled Islāmi Uloom mai Nadwatul Musannifeen ki Khidmāt: Ek mutāla,.

References

External links
 Nadwatul Musannifeen, Delhi in Encyclopaedia of India.

Research institutes in India
Research institutes established in 1938
1938 establishments in India
 
Publishing companies of India